This is a list of members of the Swiss Council of States of the 48th legislature (2007–2011). Most members were elected in the 2007 Swiss federal election.

Current members

Former members

Notes and references

See also
Political parties of Switzerland for the abbreviations
List of members of the Swiss Council of States (2003-2007)
Presidents of the Council of States
List of members of the Swiss National Council

2007